Cuaró is a caserío (hamlet) in the sparsely populated central Artigas Department of northern Uruguay.

Geography

Population
In 2011 Cuaró had a population of 113.
 
Source: Instituto Nacional de Estadística de Uruguay

References

External links
INE map of Cuaró

Populated places in the Artigas Department